The California class was a pair of nuclear-powered guided-missile cruisers operated by the United States Navy between 1974 and 1998. Like all of the nuclear cruisers, which could steam for years between refuelings, the California class was designed in part to provide high endurance escort for the navy's nuclear aircraft carriers, which were often limited in range due to their conventionally powered escorts continuously needing to be refueled.

Overview
The second California-class cruiser, was the fifth nuclear-powered cruiser in the US Navy. Other than the four ships of the Soviet Navy's , which were built with a combination of nuclear and fossil-fuel propulsion, no other country has launched nuclear-powered cruisers.

Only two ships of the class were built, California and South Carolina, and both were decommissioned in late 1999. These cruisers were named for states because they were seen as quite large, powerful, capable, and survivable ships.

California and her sister ship, South Carolina, were equipped with two Mk 13 launchers, fore and aft, capable of firing the Standard SM-1MR or SM-2MR surface-to-air missiles, one Mk 112 launcher for ASROC missiles, and eight Mk 141 launch tubes for Harpoon missiles. They were equipped with two Mk 45 5-inch rapid-fire guns, fore and aft. Four 12.75-inch torpedo launchers (two on each side, protruding from their magazine space on the main deck) were fitted for lightweight anti-submarine torpedoes. Two Mk 15 Phalanx 20 mm close-in weapon systems were fitted in the 1980s.

The ships were originally designed to carry and launch the Mark 48 torpedo from a large space beneath the flight deck aft. Although a surface-launched version of the Mk 48 was never produced, the ships retained this large magazine space until their retirement.

Both ships underwent a mid-life refueling and overhaul in the early 1990s to give them a further 18 years of active service. This modernization upgraded their two 150 MW D2G reactor plants with new 165 MW D2W reactor cores, installed the New Threat Upgrade (NTU) to improve their anti-aircraft warfare (AAW) capability, and removed their anti-submarine warfare (ASW) capability, which involved disabling their SQS-26 sonar and removing their ASROC anti-submarine weapons. However, the two triple Mk 32 ASW torpedo launchers were retained. External differences resulting from this modernization included the removal of the ASROC launcher and the large deckhouse forward of it that served as the ASROC magazine, the replacement of the SPS-40 radar antenna with the SPS-49 antenna, and the replacement of the SPS-48C with the larger SPS-48E antenna. Both ships retained the bulbous sonar domes at the forefoot (beneath the waterline) until retirement, even after their sonar systems were disabled. While the ships were as modernized as possible and were capable of service until 2010, they were still only capable of firing SM-2MR missiles from their Mk 13 launchers, and their high cost of operation made them targets for early retirement. They were both decommissioned in 1999.

Ships in class

See also
List of cruisers of the United States Navy
List of United States Navy destroyer leaders

External links

FAS: CGN-36 California class

Cruiser classes